The 55th Rescue Squadron is an aviation unit of the United States Air Force. It operates the Sikorsky HH-60G Pave Hawk helicopter and provides rapidly deployable combat search and rescue forces to theater commanders worldwide. They tactically employ the HH-60G helicopter and its crew in hostile environments to recover downed aircrew and isolated personnel during day, night, or marginal weather conditions. The squadron also conducts military operations other than war including civil search and rescue, disaster relief, international aid, emergency medical evacuation, and counter-drug activities.

Since 2003, the squadron provided rapidly deployable combat search and rescue forces worldwide; and deployed aircraft and crews in response to national disasters, domestic search and rescue, and medical evacuation ("MEDEVAC") missions.

History

North Atlantic Rescue
The 55th Air Rescue Squadron was activated on 14 November 1952, at Thule Air Force Base, Greenland, where it replaced Flight E, 6th Air Rescue Squadron, when Air Rescue Service expanded its squadrons to groups and replaced their flights with new squadrons.  It remained at Thule and trained and performed rescue and recovery missions until March 1960, when it moved to Kindley Air Force Base, Bermuda , where it was inactivated on 18 June 1960.

Reactivation

The squadron was reorganized at Kindley on 18 June 1961. Until January 1966 the unit supported crewed spacecraft recovery operations. In January 1966, it was renamed the 55th Aerospace Rescue and Recovery Squadron.  It moved to McCoy Air Force Base, Florida in February 1970.  From McCoy, and after June 1971, from Eglin Air Force Base, Florida it provided coverage for Apollo missions through the early 1970s.

Special operations
In 1988 the rescue role changed to special operations missions. During Operation Just Cause the 55th SOS performed combat search and rescue in Panama between 20 December 1989 and 14 January 1990. This was repeated during the 1991 Gulf War between January and March 1991, and again in the Persian Gulf region and the Kosovo, in 1998-1999.  On 25 February 1993, the 55th moved to Hurlburt Field, Florida, where the squadron was inactivated on 11 November 1999.

Return to rescue mission
On 22 January 2003, the squadron was reactivated at Davis-Monthan Air Force Base, Arizona (USA).  Since 2003, the squadron provided rapidly deployable combat search and rescue forces worldwide; and deployed aircraft and crews in response to national disasters, domestic search and rescue, and medical evacuation missions, like during Hurricane Katrina.

Lineage
 Constituted as the 55th Air Rescue Squadron on 17 October 1952
 Activated on 14 November 1952
 Discontinued and inactivated on 18 June 1960
 Activated on 10 May 1961 (not organized)
 Organized on 18 June 1961
 Redesignated 55th Aerospace Rescue and Recovery Squadron on 8 January 1966
 Redesignated 55th Special Operations Squadron on 1 March 1988
 Inactivated on 11 November 1999
 Redesignated 55th Rescue Squadron on 22 January 2003
 Activated on 14 March 2003

Assignments

 6th Air Rescue Group, 14 November 1952
 Air Rescue Service, 18 February 1958 – 18 June 1960
 Military Air Transport Service, 10 May 1961 (not organized)
 Air Rescue Service (later Aerospace Rescue and Recovery Service), 18 June 1961
 39th Aerospace Rescue and Recovery Wing (later 39th Special Operations Wing), 1 January 1970
 1st Special Operations Wing, 18 April 1989
 1st Special Operations Group (later 16th Operations Group), 22 September 1992 – 11 November 1999
 355th Operations Group, 14 March 2003
 563d Rescue Group, 1 October 2003 – present

Stations
 Thule Air Force Base, Greenland, 14 November 1952
 Kindley Air Force Base, Bermuda, 17 March – 18 June 1960
 Kindley Air Force Base, Bermuda, 18 June 1961
 McCoy Air Force Base, Florida, 27 February 1970
 Eglin Air Force Base, Florida, 25 June 1971
 Hurlburt Field, Florida, 25 February 1993 – 11 November 1999
 Davis-Monthan Air Force Base, Arizona, 14 March 2003 – present

Aircraft

 Boeing SB-17 Flying Fortress (1952–1955)
 Douglas SC-47 Skytrain (1952–1954)
 Sikorsky H-19 (later SH-19, HH-19)(1953–1957, 1961–1963)
 Grumman SA-16A Albatross (1953–1959)
 Piasecki YH-21 Work Horse (1953–1955)
 Piasecki SH-21 Work Horse (1956–1960)
 Douglas SC-54 Skymaster (later HC-54) (1956–1957, 1959–1960, 1961–1964)
 Kaman HH-43 Huskie (1963–1964)
 Boeing HC-97 Stratofreighter (1964–1966)
 Lockheed HC-130 Hercules (1966–1988)
 Sikorsky HH-53 Super Jolly Green Giant (1973–1980)
 Sikorsky HH-3 Jolly Green Giant (1980–1982)
 Sikorsky MH-60G Pave Hawk (1982–1999)
 Sikorsky HH-60 Pave Hawk (2003 – present)

References

Notes

Bibliography

External links
55th SOS history on globalsecurity.org

Military units and formations in Arizona
055